Group B was a set of regulations introduced in 1982 for competition vehicles in sportscar racing.

Group B may also refer to:

FIFA World Cup
 2022 FIFA World Cup Group B, England, Iran, United States, Wales
 2018 FIFA World Cup Group B, Iran, Morocco, Portugal, Spain
 2014 FIFA World Cup Group B, Australia, Chile, the Netherlands, Spain
 2010 FIFA World Cup Group B, Argentina, Nigeria, South Korea, Greece
 2006 FIFA World Cup Group B, England, Sweden, Paraguay, Trinidad & Tobago
 2002 FIFA World Cup Group B, Spain, Paraguay, South Africa, Slovenia
 1998 FIFA World Cup Group B, Italy, Chile, Austria, Cameroon
 1994 FIFA World Cup Group B, Brazil, Russia, Cameroon, Sweden
 1990 FIFA World Cup Group B, Cameroon, Romania, Argentina, Soviet Union

Other uses
 Group B streptococcal infection or strep B
 Army Group B, three German Army Groups in World War II
 the group of industrialized countries ("The West") in UNCTAD
 Group B posts in the Civil Services of India